Iglesia Basin is a sedimentary basin located in northern San Juan Province, western Argentina. It is thought to be a piggyback basin. Its sedimentary fill is of Neogene to Pleistocene age and has an estimated maximum thickness of 3.5 km. There are hot springs in the eastern part of the basin. The rock under the sedimentary fill is interpreted to be in part composed of plutonic intrusions belonging to the Tocota pluton, which in turn is a part of a larger group of plutonic intrusions known as the Colangüil Batholith.

References 

Geology of San Juan Province, Argentina
Sedimentary basins of Argentina